Hornet Peak is a sharp peak  west of Snøhetta Dome, near the south end of Ahlmann Ridge in Queen Maud Land, Antarctica. It was mapped by Norwegian cartographers from surveys and air photos by the Norwegian–British–Swedish Antarctic Expedition (1959–52) and from air photos by the Norwegian expedition (1958–59) and named Hornet (the horn). Confusingly, it is located only a few kilometres from its near-namesake, Horten Peak.

References

Mountains of Queen Maud Land
Princess Martha Coast